Camp Township is a township in Polk County, in the U.S. state of Iowa.

History
Camp Township took its name from Camp Creek.

References

Townships in Polk County, Iowa
Townships in Iowa